Seán Patrick Campbell (1889 – 27 February 1950) was an Irish Labour Party politician and trade union official. He was a member of the Dublin Typographical Provident Society and served as the president of the Irish Trades Union Congress in 1933.

He was elected to Seanad Éireann in 1938 on the Labour Panel. In 1943 and 1944, he was nominated by the Taoiseach to the Seanad. At the 1948 Seanad election, he was again elected by the Labour Panel. He died in office on 27 February 1950.

References

 

1889 births
1950 deaths
Labour Party (Ireland) senators
Members of the 3rd Seanad
Members of the 4th Seanad
Members of the 5th Seanad
Members of the 6th Seanad
Trade unionists from Dublin (city)
Nominated members of Seanad Éireann